Lewis Martin Benjamin Johnson (born 9 January 2004) is an English professional footballer who plays as a winger for National League South club Concord Rangers, on loan from  club Milton Keynes Dons.

Club career

Milton Keynes Dons
Johnson joined the academy of Milton Keynes Dons in 2019, having previously played for Aston Villa's academy since the age of 13. On 11 November 2020 he made his senior first team debut, starting in a 1–2 EFL Trophy group stage defeat at home to Southampton U21.

On 26 December 2020 he made his league debut, coming on as a 69th-minute substitute for Cameron Jerome in a 2–0 home win against Bristol Rovers. Following several first team appearances, on 16 February 2021 the club announced Johnson had signed his first professional deal. At the end of his breakthrough season, Johnson was named the LFE League One Apprentice of the Season for 2021. He spent the majority of the following 2021–22 season out on loan to Southern Premier Central clubs Banbury United and AFC Rushden & Diamonds. 

On 7 August 2022, Johnson joined was again sent out on loan, this time to National League South club Concord Rangers.

Career statistics

Honours
Banbury United
Southern League Premier Division Central: 2021–22

Individual
 LFE League One Apprentice of the Season: 2021
 Milton Keynes Dons Academy Player of the Year: 2020–21

References

2004 births
Living people
Association football forwards
English footballers
Aston Villa F.C. players
Milton Keynes Dons F.C. players
Banbury United F.C. players
AFC Rushden & Diamonds players
Concord Rangers F.C. players
English Football League players
Southern Football League players